Jay Williams (born September 1973, in London) is a British songwriter and performer. He is most recognised for his work on the Eurovision song "Love City Groove".
 
Jay signed to his first label Warner Music at the age of sixteen and was responsible for various one-hit wonders with a variety of bands/artists as diverse as RPM and The Runaways on Mo Wax, DarkMan, Ant and Dec and the "Mr Blobby" charity single, as well as serial hitmakers All Saints. Jay retired from music in 1997.

Jay is married to Kate Williams (Nee Grunwell) and lives in London with his two sons; Elias & Ethan.

References

1973 births
English songwriters
Eurovision Song Contest entrants for the United Kingdom
Living people